Algay (possibly from Quechua for to cut halfway through, to interrupt; to fail,) is a mountain in the Andes of Peru which reaches a height of approximately . It is located in the Huánuco Region, Huánuco Province, Chaulán District. It lies northeast of a lake and a mountain named Queuluacocha'''.

References

Mountains of Peru
Mountains of Huánuco Region